Broadway in Tucson/A Nederlander Presentation is part of the nationally recognized Nederlander Producing Company of America. The Nederlander organization was awarded a contract by the City of Tucson in 2003 to present a series of Broadway musicals and special events downtown at the Tucson Music Hall and Leo Rich Theater, all of which are part of the Tucson Convention Center.  Since 2003 Broadway In Tucson has been responsible for bringing over 25 Broadway shows to downtown Tucson.

February 18, 2010 marked the press release stating that Broadway in Tucson will be bringing the smash Broadway hit Wicked to Tucson, as a part of its 2010–2011 season.  For the first time ever, a Broadway in Tucson show will be held at University of Arizona's Centennial Hall.  This presentation of Wicked is co-sponsored by UApresents; subsequently this represents the first partnership between the two organizations.

Past Seasons

2004-2005 
 Kenny Loggins
 John Fogerty
 Movin' Out (musical)
 Peter Pan (1954 musical)
 Chicago (musical)
 Robert Dubac's The Male Intellect
 Queensrÿche
 B.B. King
 Thoroughly Modern Millie (musical)

2005-2006 
 Jerry Seinfeld
 Dora the Explorer
 The Black Crowes
 Little Women
 Annie
 Barenaked Ladies
 Linda Eder
 Evita
 Doctor Dolittle
 Bob Dylan
 Les Misérables
 The Lion King

2006-2007 
 The Ten Tenors
 Juan Gabriel
 All American Rejects, Motion Picture Soundtrack, The Format, Gym Class Heroes
 All Shook Up
 Altar Boyz
 Rent (musical)
 Dirty Rotten Scoundrels (musical)
 Damien Rice
 Who's Afraid of Virginia Woolf?
 Morrissey
 Kathy Griffin

2007-2008 
 A staged version of Go, Diego, Go!
 Avenue Q
 Defending the Caveman
 The Rat Pack - Live at the Sands
 The Ten Tenors
 The 25th Annual Putnam County Spelling Bee
 Cats

2008-2009 
 Rain-A Tribute to The Beatles
 Jesus Christ Superstar
 A Bronx Tale (play)
 Grease (musical)
 Mamma Mia!
 Tuna Does Vegas

2009-2010 
 John Legend (Special Nederlander Concerts Event)
 Monty Python's Spamalot
 The Ten Tenors Holiday Concert
 Legally Blonde The Musical
 Fiddler on the Roof

2010-2011 
 Jerry Seinfeld
 The Color Purple
 Disney's Beauty and the Beast
 Wicked
 Spring Awakening
 Burn the Floor

2011-2012 
 West Side Story
 Shrek The Musical
 Rock of Ages
 In the Heights
 Mary Poppins

2012-2013 
 Stomp
 Anything Goes
 Carol Burnett
 Memphis
 Wicked
 Blue Man Group
 Million Dollar Quartet

2013-2014 
 Sister Act
 American Idiot
 Mamma Mia!
 The Australian Bee Gees Show
 The Wizard of Oz
 I Love Lucy: Live on Stage
 Jersey Boys

2014-2015 
 Flashdance the Musical
 Disney's Beauty and the Beast
 Joseph and the Amazing Technicolor Dreamcoat
 Guys and Dolls
 Alton Brown Live
 Once
 Newsies

2015-2016 
 Annie
 The Phantom of the Opera
 Mythbusters: Jamie and Adam Unleashed
 Riverdance
 The Book of Mormon
 Star Trek: The Ultimate Voyage
 42nd Street
 Chicago

2016-2017 
 Cabaret
 Mamma Mia!
 The Sound of Music
 Dirty Dancing
 Motown: The Musical
 Kinky Boots
 Brain Candy Live!
 The Bodyguard

2017-2018 
 Disney's The Little Mermaid
 Beautiful: The Carole King Musical
 Rent
 Rodgers + Hammerstein's Cinderella
 Stomp
 The King and I
 The Book of Mormon
 Rain: A Tribute to the Beatles
 Finding Neverland

2018-2019 
 Les Misérables
 On Your Feet!
 Waitress
 Something Rotten!
 Fiddler on the Roof
 Cats
 The Illusionists

2019-2020 
 Hello, Dolly!
 Anastasia
 Jesus Christ Superstar
 The Play That Goes Wrong
 A Bronx Tale
 Come from Away
 The Book of Mormon
 Jersey Boys

2020-2021 
 Hamilton

References

External links
 

Culture of Tucson, Arizona
Tourist attractions in Tucson, Arizona